The Martens I Government was the national government of Belgium from 3 April 1979 to 23 January 1980. 

It was the first government headed by Wilfried Martens and comprised the Flemish Christian People's Party (CVP), the French-speaking Christian Social Party (PSC), the Flemish Belgian Socialist Party (BSP), the French-speaking Socialist Party (SP) and the Democratic Front of Francophones (FDF). It fell after nine months, when the FDF left the government.

Composition

Reshuffles
15 October 1979: José Desmarets (PSC) replaces Paul Vanden Boeynants as Deputy Prime Minister and Minister of Defence. Philippe Maystadt (PSC) replaces Antoine Humblet as Secretary of State for the Walloon Region.
16 January 1980: Lucien Outers, Léon Defosset and François Persoons resign.

Belgian governments
1979 establishments in Belgium
1980 disestablishments